Douglas Ramsay (May 5, 1944 – February 15, 1961) was an American figure skater who competed in men's singles.

Known as "Dick Button Jr.", he early won the reputation of being a particularly charismatic free skater and an audience favorite.  After placing 4th at the Junior level at the 1959 United States Figure Skating Championships, in 1960 he narrowly won the Junior title over Bruce Heiss (brother of Carol Heiss) and Frank Carroll with a performance described as "dazzling".

Ramsay was the only skater to perform a triple jump at the 1961 United States Figure Skating Championships, where he finished only fourth due to a poor performance in compulsory figures.  However, due to the illness of bronze medalist Tim Brown, he was selected to compete at the 1961 North American Figure Skating Championships and World Figure Skating Championships as the alternate.  At the North American Championships in Philadelphia, Ramsay again established himself as "the darling of the audience" and finished fourth in spite of missing a double axel.

Ramsey grew up in Detroit. His grade school, Thomas A. Edison, where he practiced skating on a rink they would flood every winter, renamed the park adjacent to the playground in his memory.

Ramsay was en route to the World Championships in 1961 when his plane (Sabena Flight 548) crashed near Brussels, Belgium, killing all on board.  He was 16 at the time of his death.

Results

 N. = novice, J. = junior

References

External links

 U.S. Figure Skating biography
 Remembering Flight 548: Shattered dreams
 

American male single skaters
1944 births
1961 deaths
Burials in Michigan
Figure skaters from Detroit
Victims of aviation accidents or incidents in Belgium
Victims of aviation accidents or incidents in 1961